The Afterman: Ascension is the sixth studio album by American progressive rock band Coheed and Cambria. It is the first part of a double album, the second part of which is The Afterman: Descension. The band took seven months to record the albums between 2011 and 2012, released a live acoustic version of "Key Entity Extraction V: Sentry the Defiant" (which appears on The Afterman: Descension) in February 2012, and announced a release date of October 9 later that year. The first single was "Key Entity Extraction I: Domino the Destitute", released in August 2012. It is the first Coheed and Cambria album since 2005's Good Apollo, I'm Burning Star IV, Volume One: From Fear Through the Eyes of Madness to feature Josh Eppard on drums, and the first to feature Zach Cooper on bass. The album received mainly positive reviews.

The deluxe version of the album was released with a coffee-table book written by band member Claudio Sanchez and edited by Evil Ink Comics' Chondra Echert and Blaze James, intended to give a song-by-song experience of the concept album. The album follows the Amory Wars storyline, and concentrates on the character Sirius Amory.

Background and recording

Coheed and Cambria began recording the double album in November 2011, and had finished recording by June 2012. It is the first Coheed and Cambria album featuring Zach Cooper on bass, and the first to feature Josh Eppard on drums since Good Apollo, I'm Burning Star IV, Volume One: From Fear Through the Eyes of Madness released in 2005.

In February, 2012, Coheed and Cambria singer/guitarist Claudio Sanchez released a self-shot acoustic rendition of a new song titled "Key Entity Extraction V: Sentry the Defiant" via the band's official YouTube channel. The song later turned out to be on the second album, The Afterman: Descension.

On August 7, 2012, Rolling Stone revealed that the first single and music video from the album would be "Key Entity Extraction I: Domino the Destitute". Later the same day they played the song for the first time as part of their set in Tucson, Arizona. The single was released digitally on August 28, along with a music video. Two weeks before the album's release, the band premiered the studio version of the title track "The Afterman" on Rolling Stone.

The band released a music video for "The Afterman" on November 16.

Release

The album was released in both digital and physical formats on October 9, 2012; the second part was released on February 5, 2013. The album name and release date were announced on July 31, 2012 via a press release and a YouTube teaser video, featuring a man in a spaceship he refers to as "All Mother". Coheed and Cambria co-produced the album with Michael Birnbaum and Chris Bittner under the label Hundred Handed/Everything Evil and will be distributed by Fontana/INgrooves.

The deluxe version of the album was released with a hardcover coffee-table book of the album's Amory Wars storyline, the concept all Coheed and Cambria's albums follow (with the exception of 2015's The Color Before the Sun). The book is written by Sanchez.  The double album tells the story of Sirius Amory, the namesake of the concept, as he explores the energy source holding together the Keywork (the 78 worlds in which the Amory Wars is set) and finds that it is in fact a horrible afterlife for departed souls. The artwork for the book was created by Heidi Taillefer and Nathan Spoor, and the book provides a "song-by-song" experience for the listener.

Critical reception

The album has received mainly positive reviews, gaining 74/100 on Metacritic from twelve reviews. Artist Direct singled out the album as the band's "best album to date". Allmusic criticized the album for being "a bit of a mess" due to the scale of its ambition, though it acknowledged that this could be forgiven as there is "so much here that works". Both The A.V. Club and Sputnikmusic rated the album as a step forward for the band.

Track listing
All songs written by Claudio Sanchez and arranged by Coheed and Cambria. Segues written and arranged by Claudio Sanchez and Josh Eppard.

Personnel

Coheed and Cambria
 Claudio Sanchez – lead vocals, rhythm guitar, electric piano, voice of Sirius Amory
 Travis Stever – lead guitar, lap steel guitar, backing vocals
 Zach Cooper – bass guitar, backing vocals
 Josh Eppard – drums, percussion, keyboards, backing vocals

Additional musicians
 John Medeski – piano, clavinet, synthesizers
 Daniel Sedownick – percussion
 Karl Berger – orchestration
 Julianne Klopotic and Chern Hwei Fung – violin
 Nicole Federici – viola
 Tomas Ulrich – cello
 Chondra Sanchez – additional background vocals, voice of The All Mother
 Madeline Birnbaum – additional background vocals

Production
 Coheed and Cambria, Michael Birnbaum and Chris Bittner – production
 Rob Gill and Jeff Champtone – guitar techs
 Rich Costey – mixing on "Key Entity Extraction I: Domino the Destitute" and "Mothers of Men" at Eldorado Studios, Burbank, CA (assisted by Chris Kasych)
 Ryan Williams – mixing on "The Afterman", "Goodnight, Fair Lady", "Key Entity Extraction II: Holly Wood the Cracked", "Key Entity Extraction III: Vic the Butcher", "Key Entity Extraction IV: Evagria the Faithful" and "Subtraction" at Pulse Recording, Silver Lake, CA
 Howie Weinberg and Dan Gerbarg – mastering at Howie Weinberg Mastering

Artwork
 Heidi Taillefer – cover art
 Nathan Spoor – interior art
 Bill Scoville – package design and additional graphics

Management
 Peter Lewit and David Rappaport (Davis, Shapiro, Lewit and Hayes) – legal representation
 David Weise, Kathy Izaguirre, Beth Sabbagh and Tagui Karagaryan (David Weise and Associates) – business management
 Kirk Sommer (William Morris Endeavor) – North America booking
 Rob Markus (William Morris Endeavor) – Mexico and Puerto Rico booking
 Steve Strange (X-Ray Touring) – booking (rest of world) (assisted by Josh Javor)
 Pete Stahl – tour production guru
 Blaze James (Velvet Hammer Music and Management Group) – navigator

Charts
The Afterman: Ascension debuted at number 5 on the Billboard 200 on October 17, 2012. It also reached number 11 on the Canadian Albums Chart and number 5 on the UK Rock Albums Chart.

References 

2012 albums
Coheed and Cambria albums
The Amory Wars
Science fiction concept albums